Camptochaete arbuscula is a species of moss found in New Zealand and Australia.

Description
Camptochaete arbuscula is a robust moss with light green or straw-coloured leaves, 2 mm long, concave, with a faint, double leaf vein. Its wiry stems have pinnately branching fronds. The sporophytes are produced on the lower sides of the fronds.

Distribution and habitat
It occurs as an epiphyte on logs in moist forests. It is widespread in New Zealand. In Australia, collections have been made in Queensland, New South Wales, Victoria, and Tasmania.

References

Flora of New Zealand
Flora of Australia
Lembophyllaceae